Kolonkovo is a rural locality (a selo) in Antipinsky Selsoviet, Togulsky District, Altai Krai, Russia. The population was 234 as of 2013. There are 3 streets.

Geography 
Kolonkovo is located on the Chumysh River, 17 km south of Togul (the district's administrative centre) by road. Antipino is the nearest rural locality.

References 

Rural localities in Togulsky District